Cecil is an unincorporated community in central Cecil Township, Washington County, Pennsylvania, United States. It has a post office with the ZIP code 15321. This ZIP covers the western portion of the Cecil-Bishop CDP. The population was 1,676 at the 2010 census.

Cecil is located in the geographical center of Cecil Township. The community is clustered around Pennsylvania Route 50. Most of this area has been developed into planned neighborhoods from farmland since the 1990s due to both the development of the Southpointe business park as well as Cecil Township's growth as a suburb of Pittsburgh.

References

Unincorporated communities in Washington County, Pennsylvania
Unincorporated communities in Pennsylvania